VTU stands for Visvesvaraya Technological University, in Karnataka State, India.

VTU may also refer to:

Veliko Tarnovo University, Bulgaria
Vilnius Gediminas Technical University, formerly Vilnius Technical University
Hermanos Ameijeiras Airport, Cuba, IATA code VTU
Turpial Airlines, Venezuela, ICAO airline designator VTU
Video teleconferencing unit
Vertu Motors, stock ticker VTU
Volunteer Training Units of the United States Navy Reserve
Victoria Teachers Mutual Bank, Australia, formerly VTU Credit Union